Battle of Ramadi may refer to one of the following:

 Battle of Ramadi (1917) - Battle between British and Ottoman Empire forces in September 1917 during the First World War 

 Battle of Ramadi (2004), part of the Iraq War

 Battle of Ramadi (2006), part of the Iraq War

 Battle of Ramadi (2013–2014), part of the War in Iraq (2013–2017)

 Battle of Ramadi (2014–2015), part of the War in Iraq (2013–2017)

 Battle of Ramadi (2015–2016), part of the War in Iraq (2013–2017)

Ramadi